Enrico Gamba (3 June 1831, in Turin – 19 October 1883, in Turin) was an Italian painter of genre scenes, period pieces and a few portraits.

Biography

His father worked for the Royal Accounting Office. He was the younger brother of Francesco Gamba, who was already well-established as a painter when Enrico was a boy. At the age of twelve, he was enrolled at the Accademia Albertina, where he studied with Michele Cusa, Giovanni Marghinotti and Carlo Arienti.

In 1850, he went to Germany, where he studied at the Städelschule in Frankfurt with Eduard von Steinle. After graduating, he toured Northern Europe with his friend, the English painter Frederic Leighton, then returned to Italy, where they frequented the Antico Caffè Greco and came to be influenced by Friedrich Overbeck.

His first major exhibitions were in 1854, at the "Promotrice di Torino", and 1855 at the "Esposizione di Brera", where he presented one of his best-known works, Titian's Funeral, which was bought by the Royal Family. That same year, he visited Leighton's studio in Paris and obtained a teaching position at the Albertina.

In 1860, the Ministry of Public Instruction commissioned him to paint a scene of King Victor Amadeus II giving aid to the victims of the War of the Spanish Succession. The painting, completed in 1864, was exhibited at the Exposition Universelle in 1867.

Following Italian unification, he devoted himself primarily to institutional work involving patriotic scenes from the Risorgimento period. In 1872, he created another well-known work, showing the playwright Carlo Goldoni studying the common people for inspiration. It was presented at a major exposition in Venice.

He also painted two curtains for theaters in Baltimore and Buenos Aires.

References

Further reading
Wunderkammer. Enrico Gamba tra purismo e accademia. (exhibition catalog) Fondazione Torino Musei, 2010

External links 

ArtNet: More works by Gamba.

1831 births
1883 deaths
Painters from Turin
19th-century Italian painters
19th-century Italian male artists
Italian male painters
Accademia Albertina alumni
Academic staff of Accademia Albertina
Italian costume genre painters